In probability theory and statistics, given two jointly distributed random variables  and , the conditional probability distribution of  given  is the probability distribution of  when  is known to be a particular value; in some cases the conditional probabilities may be expressed as functions containing the unspecified value  of  as a parameter. The conditional distribution contrasts with the marginal distribution of a random variable, which is its distribution without reference to the value of the other variable.

If the conditional distribution of  given  is a continuous distribution, then its probability density function is known as the conditional density function. The properties of a conditional distribution, such as the moments, are often referred to by corresponding names such as the conditional mean and conditional variance.

More generally, one can refer to the conditional distribution of a subset of a set of more than two variables; this conditional distribution is contingent on the values of all the remaining variables, and if more than one variable is included in the subset then this conditional distribution is the conditional joint distribution of the included variables.

Conditional discrete distributions
For discrete random variables, the conditional probability mass function of  given  can be written according to its definition as:

The relation with the probability distribution of  given  is:

Example
Consider the roll of a fair  and let  if the number is even (i.e., 2, 4, or 6) and  otherwise. Furthermore, let  if the number is prime (i.e., 2, 3, or 5) and  otherwise.

Conditional continuous distributions
Similarly for continuous random variables, the conditional probability density function of  given the occurrence of the value  of  can be written as

Also in this case it is necessary that .

The relation with the probability distribution of  given  is given by:

The concept of the conditional distribution of a continuous random variable is not as intuitive as it might seem: Borel's paradox shows that conditional probability density functions need not be invariant under coordinate transformations.

Example

Relation to independence

Properties

Additionally, a marginal of a joint distribution can be expressed as the expectation of the corresponding conditional distribution. For instance, .

Measure-theoretic formulation
Given , the Radon-Nikodym theorem implies that there is a  -measurable random variable , called the conditional probability, such thatfor every , and such a random variable is uniquely defined up to sets of probability zero.

Special cases: 

 For the trivial sigma algebra , the conditional probability is the constant function 
 If ,  then , the indicator function (defined below).
Let  be a -valued random variable. For each , define For any , the function  is called the conditional probability distribution of  given .

For a real-valued random variable (with respect to the Borel -field  on ), every conditional probability distribution is regular. In this case, almost surely.

Relation to conditional expectation 
For any event , define the indicator function:

which is a random variable. Note that the expectation of this random variable is equal to the probability of A itself:

Given a  -field , the conditional probability  is a version of the conditional expectation of the indicator function for :

An expectation of a random variable with respect to a regular conditional probability is equal to its conditional expectation.

See also 
Conditioning (probability)
Conditional probability
Regular conditional probability
Bayes' theorem

References

Citations

Sources 

 

Theory of probability distributions
Conditional probability